Edward Julius Caruthers Jr. (born April 13, 1945) is an American former athlete who competed mainly in the men's high jump event during his career.

Born in Oklahoma City, Oklahoma, he competed for the United States at the 1968 Summer Olympics held in Mexico City, Mexico, where and when he won the silver medal in the men's high jump event. Dick Fosbury, whose new jumping style went on to revolutionize the sport, won the gold medal. Ed Caruthers also was a member of the 1964 US Olympic Team with an 8th-place finish in the high jump.

Caruthers was drafted by the Detroit Lions in the 12th round of the 1968 NFL/AFL draft as a defensive back from the University of Arizona.

References

External links
 Profile
 

1945 births
American football defensive backs
American male high jumpers
American masters athletes
Arizona Wildcats football players
Arizona Wildcats men's track and field athletes
Athletes (track and field) at the 1964 Summer Olympics
Athletes (track and field) at the 1967 Pan American Games
Athletes (track and field) at the 1968 Summer Olympics
Living people
Medalists at the 1967 Pan American Games
Medalists at the 1968 Summer Olympics
Olympic silver medalists for the United States in track and field
Pan American Games gold medalists for the United States
Pan American Games medalists in athletics (track and field)
Players of American football from Oklahoma
Sportspeople from Oklahoma City
Track and field athletes from Oklahoma